The Whanganui Rugby Football Union (WRFU) is the governing body for rugby union in the Whanganui region of New Zealand. The Whanganui Rugby Football Union was formed in 1888.

The Whanganui team play from Cooks Gardens, Whanganui, and have enjoyed much success on the playing field throughout their history. The side are one of the leading provinces in New Zealand purely for the number of Divisional Championships won.

Since the introduction of the National Provincial Championship in 1976, Wanganui have won the 3rd most Provincial Championship titles, with 10 Championships to their name. They sit behind only Auckland (with 16 Championships) and Canterbury (with 13 championships). Both the Taranaki and South Canterbury Rugby Unions sit just behind Wanganui with 8 Provincial Championships each. Further to this, the Wanganui team have played in Heartland Championship Grand Finals in 11 of the last 12 seasons of the Heartland Championship competition (10 in the top tier Meads Cup, and 1 in the second tier Lochore Cup).

The Whanganui team were promoted to the top tier of New Zealand Rugby (the Air New Zealand Cup Division One competition), for the 2010 season. Subsequently, the NZRU later announced another alteration to the NPC format for 2010 and 2011, which meant the Air New Zealand Cup remained a 14-team competition.

History
The Whanganui Rugby Football Union was formed on 11 April 1888. It then joined the NZRFU as a foundation member in 1892. Wanganui's first official game after affiliation with the NZRFU was against the British and Irish Lions in 1888, with a 1–1 draw being more than encouraging for the union. In 1913 Whanganui played Australia and won 11-6 and in 1966 (with King Country) they won against touring side, British and Irish Lions 12–6.

Championships
Whanganui currently competes in the Heartland Championship, a competition for New Zealand's amateur and semi-professional provincial unions. Wanganui have won 10 Provincial Championships across all respective divisions, placing the behind only Auckland and Canterbury for the total number of Provincial Championships.

Honours

 1976 National Provincial Championship Second Division Runners Up
 1982 National Provincial Championship Second Division Runners Up
 1983 National Provincial Championship Second Division Runners Up
 1984 National Provincial Championship Second Division Runners Up
 1989 National Provincial Championship Third Division Champions
 1996 National Provincial Championship Third Division Champions
 2003 National Provincial Championship Third Division Champions
 2006 Heartland Championship Meads Cup Runners Up
 2007 Heartland Championship Meads Cup Runners Up 
 2008 Heartland Championship Meads Cup Champions 
 2009 Heartland Championship Meads Cup Champions 
 2010 Heartland Championship Meads Cup Runners Up 
 2011 Heartland Championship Meads Cup Champions 
 2012 Heartland Championship Meads Cup Runners Up 
 2014 Heartland Championship Lochore Cup Champions 
 2015 Heartland Championship Meads Cup Champions
 2016 Heartland Championship Meads Cup Champions
 2017 Heartland Championship Meads Cup Champions
 2018 Heartland Championship (S/F) Meads Cup
 2019 Heartland Championship Meads Cup Runners Up
 2020 Heartland Championship - NO COMPETITION -
 2021 Heartland Championship Lochore Cup Champions

Heartland Championship Placings

Heartland Championship Team
2015 Steelform Wanganui Heartland extended squad
Forwards: Brett Turner (Pirates); Bryn Hudson (Ngamatapouri); Cole Baldwin (Border); Daniel Fitzgerald (Marist); Fraser Hammond (Ruapehu); Kamipeli Latu (Border); Kieran Hussey (Border); Lasa Ulukuta (Pirates); Malakai Volau (Utiku OB); Peter Rowe (Ruapehu)(Captain); Renato Tikoilosomone (Border); Roman Tutauha (Ruapehu); Sam Madams (Border); Tololi Moala (Pirates); Viki Tofa (Marist). * John Smyth Brought in as injury cover.

Backs: Areta Lama (Kaierau); Ace Malo (Kaierau); Denning Tyrell (Pirates); Jaye Flaws (Taihape); Kane Tamou (Ratana); Lindsay Horrocks (Border); Michael Nabuliwaqe (Utiku OB); Poasa Waqanibau (Border); Samu Kubunavanua (Utiku OB); Simon Dibben (Marist); Stephen Pereofeta (Wanganui Collegiate); Troy Brown (Ruapehu); William Short (Ruapehu); Zyon Hekenui (Ruapehu); Trinity Spooner-Neera (Hawkes Bay)

Ranfurly Shield
A 15-all draw against the powerful Taranaki side of 1964 remains the closest the men from Wanganui have ever come to winning the Ranfurly Shield.

Taranaki v Wanganui

Into the last minutes of the match Wanganui held a 12–11 lead and even if on paper and in the match itself they had seemed the inferior team it seemed as if they would hang on. Their hero was wing Colin Pierce who had kicked all of Wanganui's points from penalties to put them ahead even though Taranaki had gained tries to John McCullough and Ross Brown.

Wanganui might well have won as the match approached the final minute but for excitement of their supporters who thinking they were part of a historic moment as Wanganui had never won the Ranfurly Shield crowded the touchline.

A desperate Brown had dropped for goal trying to gain the winning points. When it had missed Pierce had dashed to the 22 and taken a quick drop out. In the event his hurried kick had landed among the Wanganui spectators and they gave referee John Pring and touch judge George Brightwell a dilemma for they were both unsighted by the sideline mayhem were not sure whether the ball had bounced or gone out on a full.

Pring ruled that it had been on the full and so that last scrum of the match in what was the last set-piece took place on the Wanganui 22 and it was from there that Taranaki worked the move from which replacement wing Kerry Hurley grubber kicked ahead and won the chase as the ball bounced just a feet from touch over the Wanganui goal-line. And that was it: Taranaki had won 14–12.

Matches

Notable players

In 1897 John Blair became the first of 17 Wanganui players to pull on an All Blacks jersey. Until the emergence of Bill Osborne in 1975, Ernest (‘Moke’) Belliss was without doubt Wanganui's greatest contribution to New Zealand rugby. Belliss made his representative debut for Wanganui in 1914 before enlisting to serve during World War II. He first came to national attention as a member of the New Zealand Army rugby team of 1919 which won the King's Cup tournament in Britain and then toured [South Africa. Belliss played in the three home tests against the 1921 Springboks and captained the All Blacks in Australia the following year. Belliss has been compared to later players such as Waka Nathan and Buck Shelford. Commentator Winston McCarthy remembered him as hard, tough and fast, a good handler and a ferocious tackler. His opponents feared him and players of his era ranked him with the world's best. His son Jack captained Wanganui until the early 1950s and his grandson Peter Belliss was a flanker or lock for the side in the 1970s before turning his attention to bowls, a sport in which he won two world titles.

All Black Bill Osborne in South Africa, 1976
Born and bred in Whanganui]], midfield back Bill Osborne graduated from the Whanganui High School first XV straight into the Kaierau senior side. In 1973 he made his debut for Wanganui four days after his 18th birthday. Selection for the New Zealand Colts followed in 1974 and he made the All Blacks for the waterlogged test against Scotland at Eden Park in 1975. He played in 14 of the 24 matches on the 1976 tour of South Africa. In 1978 Osborne lost his spot for the home series against Australia to Bay of Plenty's Mark Taylor. He won his place back for the end-of-year tour of Britain and Ireland and played in all four internationals as the All Blacks completed their first-ever Grand Slam against the home unions. Osborne and Bruce Robertson of Counties formed one of the great midfield combinations of any All Black era.

In all Osborne played 48 times for New Zealand, including 16 tests. Having retired in 1981, he made a comeback the following season, playing in two of the three tests against Australia before once more announcing his retirement. Again he had a change of heart and by now representing Waikato he was selected for the All Blacks side to tour South Africa in 1985. This tour was cancelled as a result of court action taken against the New Zealand Rugby Union. A replacement tour of Argentina was arranged but Osborne withdrew from the side. In 1986 he joined all but two of the 1985 selections on the unsanctioned New Zealand Cavaliers tour of South Africa.

While they might not have reached the heights of Belliss and Osborne, Trevor Olney and Bob Barrell are typical of the unsung heroes of many of New Zealand's provincial unions. Between 1973 and 1990 Olney played a record 146 times for Wanganui. These were amateur days in which a player had to fit training and matches around a full-time job, so his commitment over 18 seasons was truly remarkable. Barrell scored a record 980 points for the union between 1963 and 1977.

Wanganui in Super Rugby
Wanganui, along with Wellington, Wairarapa Bush, East Coast, Poverty Bay, Hawke's Bay, Manawatu and Horowhenua-Kapiti make up the Hurricanes region.

All Blacks
There have been 17 players selected for the All Blacks while playing club rugby in Whanganui:

 Moke Belliss
 John Blair
 George Bullock-Douglas
 Andrew Donald
 Keith Gudsell
 Peter Henderson
 John Hogan
 Peter Johns
 Peter McDonnell
 Sandy McNicol
 Henare Milner
 Peter Murray
 Bill Osborne
 Waate Potaka
 Harrison Rowley
 Peina Taituha
 Hector Thomson

Clubs
Wanganui Rugby Football Union is made up of 13 clubs:
 Counties
 Border
 Hunterville
 Kaierau
 Marist
 Marton Rugby and Sports Club
 Ngamatapouri
 Ratana
 Ruapehu
 Taihape
 Utiku Old Boys
 Wanganui Pirates 
 Wanganui Tech

References

External links
  Official site

New Zealand rugby union teams
New Zealand rugby union governing bodies
Rugby clubs established in 1888
Sport in Whanganui
1888 establishments in New Zealand
Sports organizations established in 1888